Alpine skiing at the 1998 Winter Paralympics consisted of 54 events, 35 for men and 19 for women.

Medal table

Medal summary 
The competition events were:
Downhill: men - women
Super-G: men - women
Giant slalom: men - women
Slalom: men - women

Each event had separate standing, sitting, or visually impaired classifications:

LW2 - standing: single leg amputation above the knee
LW 3 - standing: double leg amputation below the knee, mild cerebral palsy, or equivalent impairment
LW4 - standing: single leg amputation below the knee
LW5/7 - standing: double arm amputation
LW6/8 - standing: single arm amputation
LW9 - standing: amputation or equivalent impairment of one arm and one leg
LW10 - sitting: paraplegia with no or some upper abdominal function and no functional sitting balance
LW11 - sitting: paraplegia with fair functional sitting balance
B1 - visually impaired: no functional vision
B2 - visually impaired: up to ca 3-5% functional vision
B3 - visually impaired: under 10% functional vision

Men's events

Women's events

See also
Alpine skiing at the 1998 Winter Olympics

References 

 

 

 Winter Sport Classification, Canadian Paralympic Committee
Alpine Skiing Historical Medallists, Official site of Vancouver 2010

1998 Winter Paralympics events
1998
Paralympics